The đồng (銅) was the currency of South Vietnam from 1953 to 2 May 1978. It was subdivided into 100 xu, also written su.

First đồng, 1953 to 1975

History

In 1953, the Vietnam branch of the Institut d'Emission des Etats du Cambodge, du Laos et du Vietnam issued notes dual denominated in piastre and đồng. At the same time, the two other branches of the Bank made similar issues with the riel in Cambodia and the kip in Laos. The đồng circulated in those parts of Vietnam not under the control of the Communist forces, which by 1954 coincided with South Vietnam. Coins denominated in su were also introduced in 1953. In 1955, an independent issue of đồng banknotes was produced by the National Bank of Vietnam.

Coins 

In 1953, 10, 20 and 50 su coins were introduced. In 1960, 1 đồng were added, followed by 10 đồng in 1964, 5 đồng in 1966 and 20 đồng in 1968. 50 đồng were minted dated 1975 but they were never shipped to Vietnam due to the fall of the South Vietnamese government. It is reported that all but a few examples were "disposed of as scrap metal" and the coin is very rare.

The coins issued can be roughly classified into five series:

Banknotes

In 1953, notes (dated 1952) were introduced by the Institut d'Emission des Etats du Cambodge, du Laos et du Vietnam in denominations of 1, 5, 10, 100 and 200 đồng. On 22 September 1955, the Ministry of Finance and Economic Affairs announced that notes from the Bank of Indochina and the Institut d’Emission issues for Cambodia and Laos would be exchanged for Institut d’Emission issues for Vietnam starting 30 September until 7 November. The Institut issues for Cambodia and Laos ceased to be legal tender on 7 October, and all Bank of Indochina notes lost their legal tender status on 31 October following the 15 October introduction of the first notes from the National Bank of Vietnam. Subsequently, the Ngân-Hàng Quốc-Gia Việt-Nam (National Bank of Vietnam) took over the issuance of paper money, introducing 2 and 500 đồng notes in 1955 and 20 and 50 đồng in 1956. Between 1964 and 1968, notes below 50 đồng were replaced by coins. In 1971, 1000 đồng notes were introduced. Due to steady inflation, 5000 and 10000 đồng notes were printed in 1975 but not issued due to the fall of Saigon.

Because counterfeit banknotes were a major issue at the time, all South Vietnamese banknotes were printed with a warning stating that counterfeiters were to be punished by penal labour.

Second đồng, 1975 to 1978
Following the defeat of South Vietnam by North Vietnamese forces, the first đồng was replaced by a new currency, known as the "liberation đồng", at a rate of 1 liberation đồng = 500 first đồng on September 22, 1975. The liberation đồng circulated until May 2, 1978, when the two Vietnamese currencies merged and the liberation đồng was replaced by the new Vietnamese đồng at a rate of 1 new đồng = 0.8 liberation đồng.

Coins
Coins were issued in denominations of 1, 2 and 5 xu. All were holed coins struck in aluminium and were issued in the name of the Ngân-Hàng Việt-Nam (Bank of Vietnam). The 2 xu coin was dated 1975. The 1 and 5 xu were not dated but Krause & Mishler date them to 1976.

Banknotes
The Ngân-Hàng Việt-Nam (Bank of Vietnam) issued notes in denominations of 10, 20 and 50 xu, 1, 2, 5, 10 and 50 đồng. The notes were dated 1966.

See also

North Vietnamese đồng

References

External links 
 Collection Banknotes of Vietnam and the World
 Art-Hanoi - Coins of South Vietnam
 Art-Hanoi - Paper Money of South Vietnam
 Saigon Black Market Exchange Rates 1955-1975

History of South Vietnam
Modern obsolete currencies
Currencies of Vietnam
Dong, South Vietnamese
1953 establishments in South Vietnam
1978 disestablishments